The Northern Ireland Act 2006 (c. 17) was an Act of the Parliament of the United Kingdom. It made provision in connection with the Northern Ireland Assembly.  It was repealed by section 22 of the Northern Ireland (St Andrews Agreement) Act 2006.

See also
Northern Ireland Act

References
Halsbury's Statutes,

External links
The Northern Ireland Act 2006, as amended from the National Archives.
The Northern Ireland Act 2006, as originally enacted from the National Archives.
Explanatory notes to the Northern Ireland Act 2006.

United Kingdom Acts of Parliament 2006
Acts of the Parliament of the United Kingdom concerning Northern Ireland
2006 in Northern Ireland